Arthur Wellington Ross (25 March 1846 – 25 March 1901) was a Canadian politician, educator and lawyer.

Biography 
Born in Nairn, Upper Canada, the son of Donald Ross, he studied at the Toronto Normal School and taught school in Cornwall, becoming headmaster for the local high school and then inspector of schools for Glengarry County. He continued his studies at the University of Toronto and then articled as an attorney and solicitor. In 1873, Ross married Jessie Flora Cattanach. He moved to Winnipeg in 1877, was admitted to the Manitoba bar in 1878 and set up practice with his brother in Winnipeg.

From 1878 to 1882, he was the Manitoba Liberal member of the Legislative Assembly of Manitoba for the electoral district of Springfield. From 1882 to 1896, he was the Liberal-Conservative member of the House of Commons of Canada for Lisgar.

Ross married Jesse Flora Cattanach and had four children: Dwight, Donald, Gertie, and John Hugo Ross.

Ross invested heavily in land and suffered heavy financial losses when land values crashed in 1882. In 1888, he entered the real estate business in Vancouver but returned to Winnipeg in 1891. After he retired from politics, he moved to Toronto, where he became involved in mining. Around 1899, he moved to Columbia Gardens in British Columbia near the gold mining area of Rossland. Ross suffered a stroke in 1901 and died from a second stroke after returning to Toronto for treatment.

References
 
 

1846 births
1901 deaths
Conservative Party of Canada (1867–1942) MPs
Manitoba Liberal Party MLAs
Members of the House of Commons of Canada from Manitoba